Kicking Up the Dust is the sixth studio album by the English band Cast, released on 21 April 2017. Produced by Al Groves, it is their first album recorded with bassist Jay Lewis, replacing founding member Pete Wilkinson who left the band in 2014. It also marks the return to recording for drummer Keith O'Neill, who had rejoined with the other members when the band reunited in 2010 but was absent from sessions for previous album Troubled Times due to his work as a tour manager.

Track listing
All songs written by John Power. Music by Cast.

Personnel
Cast
John Power – guitars, vocals
Liam "Skin" Tyson – guitars, backing vocals, pedal steel
Keith O'Neill – drums
Jay Lewis – bass, backing vocals, Fender Rhodes (track 5), organ (track 6)

Production
Al Groves – producer, mixing
Mike Marsh – mastering
James Mellor – studio assistant
Jennifer John – backing vocal arrangement (track 5)

References

Cast (band) albums
2017 albums